Bandits of the Autobahn is a 1955 West German crime film directed by Géza von Cziffra and starring Eva Ingeborg Scholz, Hans Christian Blech and Paul Hörbiger.

It was shot at the Göttingen Studios. The art director Albrecht Becker worked on designing the film's sets. The film was distributed by the German subsidiary of Columbia Pictures.

Cast
 Eva Ingeborg Scholz as Eva Berger
 Hans Christian Blech as Willi Kollanski
 Paul Hörbiger as Vater Heinze
 Karl Ludwig Diehl as Polizeirat Gerber
 Hermann Speelmans as Hauptwachtmeister Lüdecke
 Wolfgang Wahl as Franz Möller
 Charles Regnier as Paul Barra
 Klaus Kammer as Bubi
 Hans Schwarz Jr. as Schorsch
 Ellen Schwiers as Else Möller
 Ursula Justin as Margot
 Erich Scholz as Kurt Heinze
 Wolf Ackva as Polizeikommissar Breslau
 Fritz Wagner as Wolfgang Hinz
 Joseph Offenbach as Friseur
 Wolfgang Neuss as Chansonnier
 Armin Schweizer as Knösli
 Ingrid van Bergen as Inge
 Karl Walter Diess as Hannes

References

Bibliography
 Jaimey Fisher. Generic Histories of German Cinema: Genre and Its Deviations. Boydell & Brewer, 2013.

External links 
 

1955 films
1955 crime films
German crime films
West German films
1950s German-language films
Films directed by Géza von Cziffra
German black-and-white films
1950s German films
Films shot at Göttingen Studios